Rebecca Faulkenberry is a Bermudian singer and actor who has appeared on Broadway, West End theatre and screen. She has performed in Spider-Man: Turn Off the Dark, Rock of Ages and The Irishman.

Early life

Faulkenberry was born in Texas and raised in Bermuda. She moved back to the U.S. to attend the Connecticut boarding school Choate Rosemary Hall and Indiana University before completing a masters at Royal Conservatoire of Scotland.

Career

Theatre

Faulkenberry made her West End debut in High School Musical, in 2008, and went on to star in High School Musical 2 before going on the US tour of the show. Her Broadway debut followed in 2011 as the female lead, Sherrie, with Rock of Ages following the her role on the Rock of Ages national tour. After a nine-month stay with the show, Faulkenberry left Rock of Ages to join Spider-Man: Turn Off the Dark in 2011 in the lead role of Mary-Jane. In 2017 she starred as Nancy in Tim Minchin and Danny Rubin's Tony-nominated musical Groundhog Day.

Film and Television

Faulkenberry is known for guest-starring roles in Madam Secretary, Blue Bloods and Instinct. She appeared as Barbara Hoffa alongside Al Pacino in Martin Scorsese's The Irishman.

Filmography

Film

Television

Theatre

References

External links

1980 births
Living people
Bermudian musicians
Bermudian actresses